Gaysport is an unincorporated community in Muskingum County, in the U.S. state of Ohio.

History
Gaysport was laid out in 1880 by Asa Gay, and named for him. A post office called Gaysport was established in 1888, and remained in operation until 1926.

References

Unincorporated communities in Muskingum County, Ohio
1880 establishments in Ohio
Populated places established in 1880
Unincorporated communities in Ohio